Common names: Montane pitvipers.

Cerrophidion is a genus of venomous pitvipers which are endemic to southern Mexico, Central America, and western Panama. The generic name, Cerrophidion, is derived from the Spanish word cerro, which means "mountain", and the Greek word ophidion, which means "small snake". Five species are currently recognized, but no subspecies.

Description
The head scalation is highly variable, with some scales being enlarged, especially in the frontal region. The fact that the prelacunal is not fused with any of the supralabial scales is characteristic for this genus. The rest of the scalation is as follows: 1-7 intersupraoculars, 7-11 supralabials, 8-12 sublabials, 120-150 ventral scales, 22-36 subcaudal scales (undivided), and 17-21 rows (rarely 23) of dorsal scales at midbody.

Geographic range
Snakes of this genus are found in southern Mexico (in the highlands of the Mexican states of Guerrero and southeastern Oaxaca), southward though the highlands of Central America (Guatemala, El Salvador, Honduras, northern Nicaragua and Costa Rica) to western Panama.

Species

T) Type species.

Taxonomy
One additional new species has been described: C. petlalcalensis López-Luna, Vogt & Torre-Loranca, 1999.

References

Further reading
 Campbell, J.A., and W.W. Lamar. 1992. Taxonomic status of miscellaneous Neotropical viperids, with the description of a new genus. Occ. Papers Mus. Texas Tech Univ. 153: 1-31.

External links

 

Crotalinae
Snake genera